Horsfield's babbler (Malacocincla sepiaria) is a species of bird in the family Pellorneidae.
It is found in Brunei, Indonesia, Malaysia, and Thailand.
Its natural habitats are subtropical or tropical moist lowland forest and subtropical or tropical moist montane forest.

The common name commemorates the American naturalist Thomas Horsfield.

References

Collar, N. J. & Robson, C. 2007. Family Timaliidae (Babblers)  pp. 70 – 291 in; del Hoyo, J., Elliott, A. & Christie, D.A. eds. Handbook of the Birds of the World, Vol. 12. Picathartes to Tits and Chickadees. Lynx Edicions, Barcelona.

Horsfield's babbler
Birds of Malesia
Horsfield's babbler
Taxonomy articles created by Polbot